Enrique Sesma Ponce de León (born 22 April 1927) is a Mexican former football forward who played for Mexico in the 1958 FIFA World Cup. He also played for Deportivo Toluca.

References

External links
FIFA profile

1927 births
Mexico international footballers
Footballers from Puebla
Association football forwards
Deportivo Toluca F.C. players
1958 FIFA World Cup players
Living people
Liga MX players
Mexican footballers